Jill Baijings (born 23 February 2001) is a Dutch professional footballer who plays as a midfielder for German Frauen-Bundesliga club Bayer Leverkusen and the Netherlands national team.

Club career
On 1 July 2022, Baijings joined Bayer Leverkusen on a two-year deal.

International career
Baijings is a former Dutch youth international. She was member of under-19 team which reached semi-finals of 2019 UEFA Women's Under-19 Championship. She made her senior team debut on 22 October 2021 in a 8–0 FIFA World Cup qualification win against Cyprus.

Career statistics

International

References

External links
 
Senior national team profile at Onsoranje.nl (in Dutch)
Under-19 national team profile at Onsoranje.nl (in Dutch)
Under-17 national team profile at Onsoranje.nl (in Dutch)
Under-16 national team profile at Onsoranje.nl (in Dutch)
Under-15 national team profile at Onsoranje.nl (in Dutch)

2001 births
Living people
Women's association football midfielders
Dutch women's footballers
Netherlands women's international footballers
Eredivisie (women) players
Frauen-Bundesliga players
SGS Essen players
Bayer 04 Leverkusen (women) players
Dutch expatriate women's footballers
Dutch expatriate sportspeople in Germany
Expatriate women's footballers in Germany
People from Drimmelen
Footballers from North Brabant